Bihar Sharif Junction railway station, station code BEHS, is a railway station under Danapur railway division of East Central Railway. Bihar sharif is connected to metropolitan areas of India, by the Delhi–Kolkata main line via Mughalsarai–Patna route. Station is located in Bihar Sharif city in Nalanda district in the Indian state of Bihar. Bihar Sharif has well connected trains running frequently to New Delhi, Varanasi Junction, and Howrah Junction and with nearby cities Gaya Junction, Rajgir railway station, Tilaiya railway station, Bhagalpur railway station, Kiul Junction through daily passenger and express train services.

A new branch line between  railway station and Sheikhpura railway station via Neora, Jatdumri, Daniyawan, Bihar Sharif, Shiekhpura is under construction in which Bihar Sharif–Daniyawan section was partially started in 2015.

History 

Bakhtiyarpur Bihar Light Railway was a -wide narrow-gauge railway laid by Martin's Light Railways from Bakhtiyarpur to Bihar Sharif in 1903 and extended to Rajgir in 1911.

The broad-gauge line was extended from Rajgir to Tilaiya and opened in 2010. This line will transport coal from the Koderma–Hazaribagh coal belt for Barh Super Thermal Power Station via Harnaut station. The line was sanctioned in 2001–02 and is to be extended up to Koderma, which is under construction. Feasibility studies for the electrification of the Manpur–Tilaiya–Kiul sector and Fatuha–Islampur and Bakhtiyarpur–Rajgir sectors were announced in the rail budget for 2010–11. Bakhtiyarpur–Rajgir section has been electrified in 2016–2017, while Rajgir–Tilaiya–Gaya section has been electrified along with Kiul–Gaya section in 2017–2018. Bihar Sharif–Daniyawan section is electrified in 2019 and inaugurated on 17 Feb 2019 by PM Narendra Modi.

Survey work for doubling of Bakhtiyarpur–Tilaiya line has been completed and awaiting for green signal from Railway Safety Commissioner.
A new line between Bihar Sharif, Pawapuri road station and Nawada has been planned and currently Engineering cum Traffic Survey is underprocess. This line will connect Nawada to Patna directly by train via Bihar Sharif also Nawada to Rajgir via Pawapuri road station.
A new line between Bihar Sharif and Jehanabad also has been planned and currently Engineering cum Traffic Survey is underprocess. This line will connect Bihar Sharif to Jehanabad directly by train via Ekangarsarai.

Structure 

There are two platforms in the Bihar Sharif Junction railway station And platform number 3/4/5 are under construction. The platforms are interconnected with a single foot overbridge and another foot overbridge which will connect platform number 1 to 5 is also under construction.

Developments 
In February 2012, the Indian Railways had planned to set up a Railway Station Development Corporation (RSDC) that will work on improving the major railway stations including Bihar Sharif by building and developing restaurants, shopping areas and food plazas for commercial business and improving passenger amenities. As of 2018, it was still under construction.

Nearest airports 

The nearest airports to Bihar Sharif junction are:
 Lok Nayak Jayaprakash Airport, Patna 
 Gaya Airport

See also 
 Bihar Sharif city
 Nalanda district
 Rajgir city

References

External links 

Railway stations in Nalanda district
Railway stations opened in 1903
Danapur railway division
Railway junction stations in Bihar